Psychrobacter fozii is a  psychrophilic, oxidase-positive, halotolerant, Gram-negative, nonmotile coccobacillus with a strictly oxidative metabolism, first isolated from Antarctic environments. Its type strain is NF23T (=LMG 21280T =CECT 5889T).

References

Further reading

External links
LPSN
Type strain of Psychrobacter fozii at BacDive -  the Bacterial Diversity Metadatabase

Moraxellaceae
Bacteria described in 2003